Weird Worlds is an American comic book science-fiction anthology series published by DC Comics that originally ran from 1972 to 1974 for a total of 10 issues. The title's name was partially inspired by the sales success of Weird War Tales and Weird Western Tales. A second series was published in 2011.

Original series
Weird Worlds published features based on writer Edgar Rice Burroughs' creations which DC had obtained the licensing rights. This included the "John Carter of Mars" feature, by scripter Marv Wolfman and artist Murphy Anderson, which moved from Tarzan #209, and the "Pellucidar" feature from Korak, Son of Tarzan #46 drawn by Alan Weiss, Michael Kaluta, and Dan Green.

These features ran until issue #7 (October 1973) until it became economically infeasible for DC to continue publishing so many adaptations of Burroughs' work. "John Carter" would re-appear in Tarzan Family #62–64 and "Pellucidar" in Tarzan Family #66.

A new feature began in issue #8, Dennis O'Neil and Howard Chaykin's Ironwolf, which ran through issue #10. The release of the last issue of Weird Worlds was delayed for several months due to a nationwide paper shortage. The Weird Worlds stories were reprinted in an Ironwolf one-shot in March 1987.

Second series
The title was relaunched in March 2011 and ran for six issues. It featured Lobo and two new characters: Aaron Lopresti's Garbage Man and Kevin Maguire's Tanga.

In September 2011, The New 52 rebooted DC's continuity. In this new timeline, the characters appeared in the title My Greatest Adventure.

References

External links
 
 
Weird Worlds and Weird Worlds vol. 2 at Mike's Amazing World of Comics

1972 comics debuts
1974 comics endings
2011 comics debuts
2011 comics endings
Adaptations of works by Edgar Rice Burroughs
Comics anthologies
Comics by Dennis O'Neil
Comics by Howard Chaykin
Comics by Len Wein
Comics by Marv Wolfman
Comics magazines published in the United States
DC Comics titles
Defunct American comics
Fantasy comics
Science fiction comics